Diego Eduardo López (born 11 May 1995) is a Paraguayan professional footballer who plays as a midfielder.

Club career
López's career got underway with Cerro Porteño. He began featuring for the club during the 2013 Primera División season, making his professional debut on 2 December 2013 as Cerro Porteño lost 2–7 on home soil to Olimpia; he was substituted on after seventy-two minutes in place of Elías Moreira. López started and finished a 6–0 loss away to Guaraní days later. On 31 August 2014, López completed a move to Olimpia.

International career
In June 2014, López was called up by the Paraguay U20s.

Career statistics
.

References

External links

1995 births
Living people
Place of birth missing (living people)
Paraguayan footballers
Association football midfielders
Paraguayan Primera División players
Cerro Porteño (Presidente Franco) footballers
Club Olimpia footballers